Gladstone Provincial Park is a provincial park in British Columbia, Canada, surrounding and north of the north end of Christina Lake in that province's Boundary Country.

History
The park was established July 1995. Gladstone Park includes the former Ole Johnson and Texas Creek parks.

Conservation
The park aims to protect blue-listed California bighorn sheep, Grizzly bear and the red-listed Northern leopard frog.

Recreation
The following recreational activities are encouraged: Camping, hiking (there are over 48 km of trails in the park), fishing (for Kokanee, Rainbow Trout and Small-mouth Bass), swimming, canoeing and kayaking.

Location
Located 20 kilometres northeast of Grand Forks, British Columbia on Hwy 3 at the north end of Christina Lake in the Monashee Mountains.

Size
39,387 hectares in size.

References

External links
Gladstone Provincial Park

Provincial parks of British Columbia
Monashee Mountains
Boundary Country
1995 establishments in British Columbia
Protected areas established in 1995